Anti-Europeanism and Europhobia are political terms used in a variety of contexts, implying sentiment or policies in opposition to Europe.

In the context of racial or ethno-nationalist politics, this may refer to the culture or peoples of Europe. In the shorthand of "Europe" (a British usage, standing for the European Union or European integration), it may refer to Euroscepticism, 
criticism of policies of European governments or the European Union. 
In the context of United States foreign policy, it may refer to the geopolitical divide between "transatlantic", "transpacific" and "hemispheric" (pan-American) relations.

British usage
"Europhobia" is used of British attitudes towards the Continent, either in the context of anti-German sentiment or of anti-Catholicism,
or, more recently, of Euroscepticism in the United Kingdom.

US usage
American exceptionalism in the United States has long led to criticism of European domestic policy (such as the size of the welfare state in European countries) and foreign policy (such as European countries that did not support the US led 2003 invasion of Iraq). The ideological split between reverence for European refinery and classics and an emerging anti-French and anti-European sentiment played already a role between John Adams, Alexander Hamilton and their fellow Federalists, and Thomas Jefferson and other Democratic-Republicans urging closer ties.

See also
 
 Anti-European sentiment (disambiguation)

References

Further reading 

Earlier version: 

Anti-European sentiment
European
Politics of Europe